Piatro Kuzmich Kravchanka (born 13 August 1950) is a Belarusian diplomat, political scientist, historian and politician. He was the last foreign minister of the Byelorussian SSR for ten days from 17 to 27 July 1990. He became the first Minister of Foreign Affairs from 1990 to 1994. He served as a deputy leader of Supreme Soviet of Belarus from 15 May 1990 to 27 November 1996.

Piotr Kravchenko was born on 13 August 1950 in Smalyavichy in Byelorussian SSR. He graduated at Belarusian State University from 1972 to 1976. In 1985, he was appointed by general secretary of Communist Party of the Soviet Union Mikhail Gorbachev as First Secretary of the Minsk City Committee of the CPB. He was the Belarus Ambassador to Japan from 1999 to 2002.

Personal life 
Kravchenko is married to his wife and has two children. He is also a practising Roman Catholic.

References

Further reading 
 Centrum Naukowo-Analityczne „Białoruska Perspektywa”: Kto jest kim w Białorusi. Białystok: Podlaski Instytut Wydawniczy, 2000, s. 313, seria: Biblioteka Centrum Edukacji Obywatelskiej Polska – Białoruś. .

1950 births
Living people
People from Smalyavichy District
20th-century Belarusian historians
Belarusian male writers
Belarusian diplomats
Communist Party of Byelorussia politicians
Members of the Supreme Council of Belarus
Belarusian Roman Catholics
Ambassador Extraordinary and Plenipotentiary (Soviet Union)
Foreign ministers of Belarus
Belarusian State University alumni
Ambassadors of Belarus to Japan
Male non-fiction writers